Kubinka I, also called Kubinka-1 is a railway station of Belorussky suburban railway line in Kubinka town, Moscow Oblast, Russia.

History 
Kubinka station was established in 1870. In 1899–1900, a brick station building was constructed from the design of architect .

Description 
The station has two platforms: the island high (linked with the town by a pedestrian bridge) and the low side platform. The platforms are not connected to each other.

The station has a two-storey station building.

Kubinka has no turnstiles, but has ticket validators for the Moscow Central Diameters.

Near to the station the monument of the MiG-23 was erected in 2020.

Traffic 
Kubinka station provides connections in three directions: Belorussky suburban railway line, Greater Ring of the Moscow Railway and a special railway line to the Patriot Park.

Gallery

References

Links 
 Turntables: on tutu.ru, on Yandex Raspisaniya

Railway stations in Moscow Oblast
Railway stations of Moscow Railway
Railway stations in the Russian Empire opened in 1870